Gérard Janvion (born 21 August 1953) is a French former professional footballer who played as a defender. A French international from 1975 to 1982 he made 40 appearances for the France national team. Having started his senior career in 1972 at Saint-Étienne he went on to spend most of playing days there before joining Paris Saint-Germain in 1983. He retired from playing in 1987 after a two-year stint with Béziers.

Club career
Janvion started his career in Martinique with the local side CS Case-Pilote. He played professionally for AS Saint-Étienne, where he competed alongside Michel Platini (1972–83) and Paris Saint-Germain (1983–85) before retiring at AS Béziers.

Janvion was also the manager of Martinique's top-level side CS Case-Pilote in the 2007–08 season.

International career
From 1975 to 1982, Janvion earned 40 caps for France. He also participated in two World Cups (1978 and 1982).

Honours
Saint-Étienne
Division 1: 1973–74, 1974–75, 1975–76, 1980–81
Coupe de France: 1973–74, 1974–75, 1976–77

References

External links
 Career stats – AS Saint-Étienne

External links
 
 

1953 births
Living people
Sportspeople from Fort-de-France
Martiniquais footballers
French footballers
France international footballers
Association football defenders
1978 FIFA World Cup players
1982 FIFA World Cup players
AS Saint-Étienne players
Paris Saint-Germain F.C. players
AS Béziers Hérault (football) players
Ligue 1 players
French people of Martiniquais descent
Black French sportspeople